Luke Wadding, O.F.M. (16 October 158818 November 1657), was an Irish Franciscan friar and historian.

Life

Early life
Wadding was born on 16 October 1588 in Waterford to Walter Wadding of Waterford, a wealthy merchant, and his wife, Anastasia Lombard (sister of Peter Lombard, Archbishop of Armagh and Primate of Ireland). Educated at the school of Mrs. Jane Barden in Waterford and of Peter White in Kilkenny, in 1604 he went to study in Lisbon and at the University of Coimbra.

Franciscan friar
After completing his university studies, Wadding became a Franciscan friar in 1607, and spent his novitiate at Matosinhos, Portugal. He was ordained priest in 1613 by João Manuel, Bishop of Viseu, and in 1617 he was made President of the Irish College at the University of Salamanca, and Master of Students and Professor of Divinity. The next year, he went to Rome as chaplain to the Spanish ambassador to the Papal States, Bishop Antonio Trejo de Sande, O.F.M. Wadding collected the funds for the establishment of the College of St. Isidore in Rome, for the education of Irish priests, opened 24 June 1625, with four lecturers — Anthony O'Hicidh of a famous literary family in Thomond, Martin Breathnach from Donegal, Patrick Fleming from Louth, and John Punch from Cork. He gave the college a library of 5,000 printed books and 800 manuscripts, and thirty resident students soon came. Wadding served as rector of the college for 15 years. From 1630 to 1634, he was Procurator of the Order of Friars Minor at their headquarters in Rome, and Vice Commissary from 1645 to 1648.  During the papal conclaves of 1644 and 1655, Wadding received votes to become pope, making him "as close as the church has come to having an Irish pope."

Wadding was an enthusiastic supporter of the Irish Catholics during the Irish Confederate Wars, and his college became the strongest advocate of the Irish cause in Rome. (This spirit of patriotism originated by Wadding had a lasting impact, so that the 19th-century Catholic Archbishop George Errington, who was sent by British prime minister Gladstone to explain the relation of English and Irish politics in Rome, reported that those Irish politicians thought most extreme in England were conservatives compared with the collegians of St. Isidore.) Wadding sent officers and arms to Ireland, and induced Pope Innocent X to send there Giovanni Battista Rinuccini.

The confederate Catholics petitioned Pope Urban VIII to make Wadding a cardinal, but he found ways to intercept the petition, and it remained in the archives of the college.

Luke Wadding was an important art patron. He commissioned artworks for St. Isidore's church in Rome. The painters Andrea Sacchi and Carlo Maratti were the most famous artists commissioned by Wadding.

Death
Wadding died on 18 November 1657 at the age of 69 and is buried in the church of the College of San Isidore, in Rome. His life was written by Francis Harold, his nephew. The learned Franciscan friar Bonaventura Baron was another nephew.

Legacy
Wadding founded the Pontifical Irish College for Irish secular clergy. In 1900, Wadding's portrait and part of his library were in the Franciscan friary on Merchant's Quay, Dublin. Through Wadding's efforts, St Patrick's Day became a feast day.  But it would take years for it to develop, taking until the 20th century for St. Patrick's Day parades to occur in his native Ireland, while the first organized celebration in America took place in the 18th century in cities like Boston and New York, and today occurs in faraway places like Russia and Japan.  Amid all the celebrations, most Irish today do not know about the "Waterford man who created St. Patrick's Day."

Prior to the 1950s, when work began on a new critical edition, the Wadding Edition of the works of Duns Scotus was the most complete version of the thought of the Subtle Doctor available to scholars. The work was complied in 1639, when Wadding was in Rome, and updated in the 1890s. Whilst containing a number of spurious works, as of 2021, with the new Vatican Edition of Scotus yet to be completed, the Wadding Edition remains an important and influential collection.

In the 1950s, a statue of Wadding by Gabriel Hayes was erected on the Mall in Waterford, adjacent to Reginald's Tower and one of the city's most prominent locations. The Waterford-born Franciscan's literary, academic and theological attributes were denoted by a quill pen held poised in the statue's right hand. More recently this statue was replaced by one of Thomas Francis Meagher. The figure of Luke Wadding was moved to a position at the entrance to the French Church, Waterford on Greyfriars.

In 2000, the Waterford Institute of Technology dedicated a new library building to his name.

Works
A voluminous writer, his chief work was the Annales Minorum in 8 folio volumes (1625–1654), re-edited in the 18th century and continued up to the year 1622; it is the classical work on Franciscan history. He published also a Bibliotheca of Franciscan writers, an edition of the works of Duns Scotus, and the first collection of the writings of St Francis of Assisi.

Wadding published a total of 36 volumes – fourteen at Rome, twenty-one at Lyon, and one at Antwerp.

 Annales Minorum, in eight volumes (1625–54)
 Duns Scotus in twelve volumes (1639, fol.)
 πρεσβεία [Presbeia] published at Louvain (1624)
a treatise on the Immaculate Conception of the Virgin. The doctrine of the Immaculate Conception of the Virgin, the works of Duns Scotus, and the history of the Franciscan order were his favourite subjects of study.
 De Hebraicæ origine, præstantia, et utilitate
his essay is prefixed to the concordance of the Hebrew scriptures of Mario di Calasio, which Wadding prepared for the press in 1621.

See also 
Michael Wadding (priest)
List of people on stamps of Ireland

References

Sources
 
Attribution:

Referred works
Harold, Francis, Vita Fratris Lucae Waddingi (1731)
Ware, James, The Whole Works of Sir James Ware Concerning Ireland (1764)
Webb, Alfred, A Compendium of Irish Biography: Comprising Sketches of Distinguished Irishmen (1878)

 Meehan, Charles Patrick, The rise and fall of the Irish Franciscan monasteries, and memoirs of the Irish hierarchy in the seventeenth century (1877)
 O'Shea, Joseph A, 'The Life of Father Luke Wadding, Founder of St. Isidore's College, Rome' (1885)
 Fidanza, Giovan Battista, Luke Wadding's art: Irish Franciscan Patronage in Seventeenth Century Rome, Franciscan Institutes Publications, St. Bonaventure, NY (2016)

External links 
 

Luke Wadding Papers: correspondence relating to Fr Luke Wadding OFM and the Irish Friars Minor at St. Isidore's College, Rome &c. — a UCD Digital Library Collection.

1588 births
1657 deaths
People from Waterford (city)
People educated at Kilkenny College
Roman Catholic writers
17th-century Irish historians
Irish Friars Minor
17th-century Irish Roman Catholic priests
Franciscan scholars
University of Coimbra alumni
Irish expatriates in Italy
Irish expatriates in Spain
Scotism
Academic staff of the University of Salamanca
Irish Franciscans
17th-century Latin-language writers